Andris Reinholds (born 7 June 1971) is a Latvian rower. He competed at the 1996 Summer Olympics and the 2000 Summer Olympics.

References

External links
 

1971 births
Living people
Latvian male rowers
Olympic rowers of Latvia
Rowers at the 1996 Summer Olympics
Rowers at the 2000 Summer Olympics
Sportspeople from Riga